McBratney is a surname. Notable people with the surname include:

James McBratney (1941–1973), American mobster
Sam McBratney (1943–2020), Northern Irish writer

See also
United States v. McBratney, a United States Supreme Court case